
Gmina Augustów is a rural gmina (administrative district) in Augustów County, Podlaskie Voivodeship, in north-eastern Poland. Its seat is the town of Augustów, although the town is not part of the territory of the gmina.

Villages
Gmina Augustów contains the villages and settlements of Białobrzegi, Biernatki, Bór, Chomątowo, Czarnucha, Czerkiesy, Gabowe Grądy, Gliniski, Góry, Grabowo, Grabowo-Kolonie, Jabłońskie, Janówka, Jeziorki, Kolnica, Komaszówka, Mazurki, Mikołajówek, Naddawki, Netta (in fact three villages: Netta I, Netta II and Netta-Folwark), Obuchowizna, Osowy Grąd, Ponizie, Posielanie, Promiski, Pruska Mała, Pruska Wielka, Rutki Nowe, Rzepiski, Stare Rudki, Stuczanka, Świderek, Topiłówka, Turówka, Twardy Róg, Uścianki, Żarnowo (Żarnowo I, Żarnowo II, Żarnowo III) and Zielone.

Neighbouring gminas
Gmina Augustów is bordered by the gminas of Bargłów Kościelny, Kalinowo, Nowinka, Płaska, Raczki and Sztabin.

References

Augustow
Augustów County